The House on KY 1492, near Milton, Kentucky, was listed on the National Register of Historic Places in 1984.

It was built during 1800 to 1820 and was deemed notable as "an outstanding example of the Federal style" in Trimble County.

It was described in 1982 as a one-and-a-half-story brick house, with brick laid in Flemish bond.  Its facade had four bays including a pedimented entrance pavilion.  The house was in deteriorated condition in 1982.

It was located off Kentucky Route 1492.  The house appears no longer to exist.

References

National Register of Historic Places in Trimble County, Kentucky
Federal architecture in Kentucky
Houses completed in 1820
Houses on the National Register of Historic Places in Kentucky
Houses in Trimble County, Kentucky